"Unidentified Black Males" is the 61st episode of the HBO original series The Sopranos and the ninth of the show's fifth season. Written by Matthew Weiner and Terence Winter, and directed by Tim Van Patten, it originally aired on May 2, 2004.

Starring
 James Gandolfini as Tony Soprano
 Lorraine Bracco as Dr. Jennifer Melfi 
 Edie Falco as Carmela Soprano
 Michael Imperioli as Christopher Moltisanti
 Dominic Chianese as Corrado Soprano, Jr. *
 Steven Van Zandt as Silvio Dante
 Tony Sirico as Paulie Gualtieri
 Robert Iler as Anthony Soprano, Jr. 
 Jamie-Lynn DiScala as Meadow Soprano
 Drea de Matteo as Adriana La Cerva
 Aida Turturro as Janice Soprano Baccalieri *
 Vincent Curatola as Johnny Sack 
 John Ventimiglia as Artie Bucco 
 Steve Buscemi as Tony Blundetto

* = credit only

Guest starring

Synopsis

Tony notices Tony B's foot injury, which he blames on an attempted assault by several black men. The next day, Tony learns from Johnny that Joey Peeps's killer was limping. He nearly passes out from a panic attack. Confronted by Tony, Tony B calmly denies his involvement. Tony, aware of his cousin's tough financial situation, decides to put him in control of an illegal casino on Bloomfield Avenue and have him made. Christopher resents this favoritism.

At Joey's funeral, Johnny realizes that Little Carmine engineered the hit as payback for Lorraine Calluzzo's murder. Johnny suspects Tony B's involvement because one of his informants saw him near the scene of the crime. In a confrontation with Johnny, Tony makes up an alibi for Tony B. Johnny reluctantly accepts the story, but wordlessly threatens Tony if he finds out he is lying. In a session with Dr. Melfi, Tony's panic attacks are traced to his recent encounters with Tony B. He admits the truth about what really happened the night Tony B was arrested in the 1980s. Tony had a panic attack after arguing with his mother Livia and covered it up with a story of being beaten up by black men. Tony realizes that he has been assuaging his own guilt and shame.

A faux pas causes tensions between Meadow's boyfriend, Finn DeTrolio, and Tony. After they make amends, Tony gets Finn a job at a mob-run construction site, where several members of his crew have "no-work" jobs. In the unfamiliar situation, Finn is uneasy. Uneasiness turns into fear after he witnesses a violent encounter between Eugene Pontecorvo and Little Paulie over homophobic jibes. The next day, Finn arrives at work early in the morning, and accidentally catches Vito performing oral sex on a male security guard. Later, Vito tries to coerce Finn into attending a New York Yankees game with him. Fearing for his life, Finn considers leaving New Jersey for the time being, prompting a heated argument with Meadow, which goes on through the night. Sometime after four o'clock, he proposes to her.

Carmela finally decides to divorce Tony and obtain her share of their assets. He is furious; looming over her he says, "You're entitled to shit." During a consultation, Carmela becomes encouraged when she learns that a forensic accountant could discover Tony's unreported financial assets. After contacting several lawyers, Carmela realizes that Tony has consulted them all to prevent them from taking her case, and no forensic accountant is willing to assess his finances. She becomes tearful looking out the window at Tony floating in the swimming pool, while Meadow on the phone tells her about her engagement.

Title reference
Numerous misfortunes that members of the crime family have experienced, usually at one another's hands, are falsely blamed on black males. Four are mentioned in this episode: Tony's absence the night Tony B was arrested; the death of Jackie Aprile, Jr. in "Army of One"; Tony B's foot injury from the previous episode which he still suffers from in this episode; and the injuries Eugene causes to Little Paulie's head in this episode (Vito said, "What? I think I seen a couple of niggers, runnin' that way!").

Connections to previous episodes
 Christopher sang a few words of "If I Were a Carpenter" in the Season 4 episode "No Show," beginning the opening verse as "If I were a carpenter, and you were a douchebag..."
 Little Carmine dismisses suggestions to negotiate with Johnny Sack by saying: "This is not the U.N." In the episode "Where's Johnny?", Johnny Sack responded to Tony's suggestion of a power-sharing arrangement: "What's this, the fuckin' U.N. now?!"
 In Season 4, Episode 13, "Whitecaps," Tony is advised to quickly consult all the best local lawyers so that they cannot represent his wife. He has apparently done so.
 In the beach scene in this episode, Bichu Rap by Titi Robin is being played in the background. This song is also featured in Season 5, Episode 1, Two Tonys, where it is being played in Meadow's car when Meadow picks AJ up to go to dinner at Janice and Bobby's house.

Other cultural references
 When Tony tells his cousin there was a witness to the "Joey Peeps" murder who saw a man limping away, Tony B quips the murderer could have been Long John Silver.
 Paulie refers to Finn as Shaggy, due to his resemblance to the Scooby-Doo character.
 Vito tells Finn that he looks like Joe Perry, the lead guitarist for Aerosmith.
 Eugene Pontecorvo and Patsy Parisi ask Finn whether Mike Tyson or Muhammad Ali would win a boxing fight if both were in their prime, a question which Finn is afraid to answer for fear of angering Eugene and causing another of his violent outbursts.
Lee Nieman, one of the divorce lawyers Carmela calls, is played by real-life lawyer Sidney Davidoff who was famously one of the 20 names on Nixon's Enemies List (and, as of May 2021, one of the last two living people on the list).

Production
 Joseph R. Gannascoli came up with the idea of Vito being a gay mobster after reading about a member of the Gambino crime family who was gay and allowed to live for the sake of being a good earner.

Music 
 The song played over the end credits is "If I Were a Carpenter" sung by Bobby Darin.
 The song played during the scene where Meadow and Finn are at the beach party is "Bichu Rap" by Titi Robin. This song is also heard in the earlier Season 5 episode Two Tonys.

References

External links
"Unidentified Black Males"  at HBO

The Sopranos (season 5) episodes
2004 American television episodes
Television episodes directed by Tim Van Patten
Television episodes written by Terence Winter